The 1996 United States presidential election in Washington took place on November 5, 1996, as part of the 1996 United States presidential election. Voters chose 11 representatives, or electors to the Electoral College, who voted for president and vice president.

The State of Washington was won by President Bill Clinton (D–AR) over Senator Bob Dole (R–KS), with Clinton winning 49.84% to 37.30% for a margin of 12.54%. Billionaire businessman Ross Perot (Reform–TX) finished in third, with 8.92% of the popular vote. , this is the last election in which Spokane County, Kittitas County, Pend Oreille County, Ferry County, and Asotin County voted for a Democratic presidential candidate.

Results

Results by county

See also
 United States presidential elections in Washington (state)
 Presidency of Bill Clinton

References

 

Washington
1996
1996 Washington (state) elections